Waldeck-Frankenberg is a Kreis (district) in the north of Hesse, Germany. Neighbouring districts are Höxter, Kassel, Schwalm-Eder, Marburg-Biedenkopf, Siegen-Wittgenstein, Hochsauerland.

History
The district was created in 1972 by merging the two districts of Frankenberg and Waldeck. Most of the area of the district was previously part of the Freistaat Waldeck, the successor of the principality of Waldeck.

Geography
With , it's the largest district in Hessen.

The Eder is also the main river in the district; the Diemel in the north is a smaller river.

Mountains
Osterkopf
Sähre

Hills
Kohlenberg

Coat of arms
Blason
“Per bend sinister Azure a lion rampant issuant per fess Argent and Gules and Or a star with eight rays Sable.”
The coat of arms shows the lion of Hesse in chief. The eight-fold star in base is taken from the coat of arms of the counts and princes of Waldeck, and was also the coat of arms of the former district of Waldeck.

Towns and municipalities

Towns
 Bad Arolsen
 Bad Wildungen
 Battenberg (Eder)
 Diemelstadt
 Frankenau
 Frankenberg (Eder)
 Gemünden (Wohra)
 Hatzfeld (Eder)
 Korbach
 Lichtenfels
 Rosenthal
 Volkmarsen
 Waldeck
Municipalities
 Allendorf (Eder)
 Burgwald
 Diemelsee
 Edertal
 Haina (Kloster)
 Twistetal
 Vöhl
 Willingen (Upland)

References

External links

Official website (German)

 
Districts of Hesse